Dominique-Octave Mannoni (29 August 1899, in Sologne – 30 July 1989, in Paris) was a French psychoanalyst and author.

Life 
After spending more than twenty years in Madagascar, Mannoni returned to France after World War II where he, inspired by Lacan, published several psychoanalytic books and articles. In 1964, he followed Lacan into the École Freudienne de Paris, where he remained (with his wife Maud Mannoni) a loyal supporter to the end.

Work 
Arguably his most well known work, Prospero and Caliban: The Psychology of Colonization, deals with colonization and the psychology of the colonizer and the colonized. Mannoni saw the coloniser, with his "Prospero complex" as one in regressive flight from a father complex, using splitting and the scapegoating of the colonised to evade personal problems; the colonised as hiding resentment behind dependency.

The book was later criticized by writers such as Frantz Fanon for underestimating the socio-materialistic roots of the colonial encounter. Nevertheless, it was to influence a generation of Shakespeare directors like Jonathan Miller, who considered that Mannoni "saw Caliban and Ariel as different forms of black response to white paternalism".

Another of Mannoni's well-known works was "Clefs pour l'imaginaire ou l'Autre Scène", Seuil, 1969.

Bibliography
 Psychologie de la colonisation, Seuil, 1950, also published as Prospero et Caliban, in 1984, and as Le racisme revisité, in 1997
 English translation: Prospero and Caliban (1956)
 Lettres personnelles à Monsieur le Directeur, Seuil, 1951, republished as La Machine in 1977, and once more as Lettres personnelles, fiction lacanienne d'une analyse, in 1990
 Freud par lui-même. Éditions du Seuil (1968)
 English translation: Freud: Theory of the Unconscious. Verso Books, 2015.
 'The Decolonization of Myself' Race, VII 1966:327-35
 Clefs pour l'imaginaire ou l'Autre Scène, Seuil, 1969
 Fictions freudiennes, Seuil, 1978
 Un commencement qui n'en finit pas : Transfert, interprétation, théorie, Seuil, 1980
 Ça n'empêche pas d'exister, Seuil, 1982
 Un si vif étonnement, Seuil, 1988
 Nous nous quittons, c'est là ma route: carnets, Denoël, 1990

See also

References

External links
Postcolonial Studies at Emory

Postcolonialism
1899 births
1989 deaths
French psychiatrists
French non-fiction writers
Analysands of Jacques Lacan
French male writers
20th-century non-fiction writers
Male non-fiction writers